Elin Jones (born 1 September 1966) is a Welsh politician who has served as the Llywydd of the Senedd since 2016. A member of Plaid Cymru, Jones has been the Member of the Senedd (MS) for Ceredigion since 1999.

Background
Jones attended Llanwnnen Primary School and Lampeter Comprehensive. She graduated from University of Wales, Cardiff with a BSc in Economics and took a post-graduate MSc in Agricultural Economics at the University of Wales, Aberystwyth in 1989. Previously she was employed as an Economic Development officer for the Development Board for Rural Wales. She is a former Shadow Environment, Planning and Countryside Minister.

Jones speaks Welsh and English. She is also a former director of Radio Ceredigion and of Wes Glei Cyf, a television production company. She lives in Aberaeron and enjoys music, film, reading and formerly sang with the Welsh singing group Cwlwm.

Political career
Elin Jones served on Aberystwyth Town Council from 1992 to 1999 and was the youngest-ever Mayor of Aberystwyth from 1997 to 1998. She was the National Chair of Plaid Cymru between 2000 and 2002.

In the first Assembly elections in 1999 Elin Jones was elected as Assembly Member for Ceredigion and served as Shadow Economic Development Minister during the Assembly’s first term. Following the Assembly election in 2003, she retained this portfolio until 2006 when she became Shadow Minister for Environment, Planning & Countryside. On 9 July 2007 the One Wales government was formed and Elin Jones was made Minister for Rural Affairs. Elin Jones continued in this position until Plaid Cymru left Government at the 2011 elections. Her record was criticized by George Monbiot in his 2013 book Feral.

In the fourth Assembly she became Plaid's health spokesperson and unsuccessfully contested the leadership election following the resignation of Ieuan Wyn Jones.

In the fifth Assembly she beat fellow Plaid Cymru AM Dafydd Elis-Thomas to become Presiding Officer of the National Assembly for Wales by 34 votes to his 25.

In June 2021, Jones attempted to ban Members of the Senedd from displaying flags in their offices.

References

External links
Elin Jones' Official website
Plaid Cymru's Official website

Offices held

1966 births
Living people
Councillors in Wales
Alumni of Cardiff University
Alumni of Aberystwyth University
Members of the Welsh Assembly Government
Mayors of places in Wales
Plaid Cymru members of the Senedd
Plaid Cymru politicians
Wales AMs 1999–2003
Wales AMs 2003–2007
Wales AMs 2007–2011
Wales AMs 2011–2016
Wales MSs 2021–2026
Welsh-speaking politicians
Women mayors of places in Wales
Female members of the Senedd
Presiding Officers of the Senedd
20th-century British women politicians
Women members of the Welsh Assembly Government
People from Ceredigion
Government ministers of the United Kingdom
Members of the Privy Council of the United Kingdom
Welsh politicians
People from Lampeter
Women councillors in Wales